Kwame Malik Kilpatrick (born June 8, 1970) is a former American politician who served as the 72nd mayor of Detroit from 2002 to 2008. A member of the Democratic Party, he previously represented the 9th district in the Michigan House of Representatives from 1997 to 2002. Kilpatrick resigned as mayor in September 2008 after being convicted of perjury and obstruction of justice. He was sentenced to four months in jail and was released on probation after serving 99 days.

In May 2010, Kilpatrick was sentenced to eighteen months to five years in state prison for violating his probation, and served time at the Oaks Correctional Facility in northwest Michigan. In March 2013, he was convicted on 24 federal felony counts, including mail fraud, wire fraud, and racketeering. In October 2013, Kilpatrick was sentenced to 28 years in federal prison, and was incarcerated at the Federal Correctional Institution in Oakdale, Louisiana. In January 2021, President Donald Trump commuted his sentence.

Early life, education and family
Kwame Malik Kilpatrick was born June 8, 1970, to Bernard Kilpatrick and Carolyn Cheeks Kilpatrick. His parents divorced in 1981. Kilpatrick attended Detroit's Cass Technical High School and graduated from Florida A&M University with a Bachelor of Science degree in political science in 1992. He played football under Ken Riley. On September 9, 1995, he married Carlita Poles in Detroit. They have three children together, Jalil, Jonas, and Jelani. In 1999 he received a Juris Doctor degree from the Detroit College of Law (now the Michigan State University College of Law). He has a sister Ayanna and a half-sister, Diarra.

Kilpatrick's mother Carolyn was a career politician, representing Detroit in Michigan House of Representatives from 1979 to 1996 and serving in the United States House of Representatives for Michigan's 13th congressional district from 1996 to 2010. She was not re-elected to office because she lost her primary election in August 2010 to State Senator Hansen Clarke. NPR and CBS News both noted that throughout her re-election campaign, Carolyn was dogged by questions about her son Kwame following his tenure as mayor of Detroit.

Kilpatrick's father Bernard was a semi-professional basketball player and politician. He was elected to the Wayne County Commission, served as head of Wayne County Health and Human Services Department from 1989 to 2002, and as chief of staff to former Wayne County Executive Edward H. McNamara. Later he operated a Detroit consulting firm called Maestro Associates.

Kilpatrick filed for divorce from Carlita in 2018. In July 2021 he married Laticia Maria McGee at Historic Little Rock Missionary Baptist Church in Detroit.

Political career

Michigan state representative
Kwame Kilpatrick was elected to the Michigan House of Representatives in 1996 after his mother vacated her Detroit-based seat to mount a successful bid for Congress. Kilpatrick's campaign staff consisted of high school classmates Derrick Miller and Christine Beatty, who became his legislative aide; later, Kilpatrick had an affair with Beatty. According to Kilpatrick, the campaign was run on a budget of $10,000 and did not receive endorsements from trade unions, congressional districts, or the Democratic establishment.

Kilpatrick was elected minority floor leader for the Michigan Democratic Party, serving in that position 1998 to 2000. He was subsequently elected as house minority leader in 2001, the first African-American to hold that position. Later in 2001, Kilpatrick ran for mayor of Detroit, hiring Berg/Muirhead Associates for his campaign. They were retained as his public relations firm upon his election.

Mayor of Detroit

First term
In 2001, Kilpatrick became the youngest mayor of Detroit when elected at age 31.

During his first term, Kilpatrick was criticized for using city funds to lease a Lincoln Navigator for use by his family and using his city-issued credit card to charge thousands of dollars' worth of spa massages, extravagant dining, and expensive wines. Kilpatrick paid back $9,000 of the $210,000 credit card charges. Meanwhile, Kilpatrick closed the century-old Belle Isle Zoo and Belle Isle Aquarium because of the city's budget problems. The City Council overrode his funding veto for the zoo and gave it a budget of $700,000.

In 2005, Time magazine named Kilpatrick as one of the worst mayors in America.

Special administratorship
Since the 1970s, a federal judge had made the mayor of Detroit the special administrator of the Detroit Water Department because of severe pollution issues. When serious questions about water department contracts came to light in late 2005, Judge Feikens ended Kilpatrick's special administratorship in his capacity as mayor. In January 2006, The Detroit News reported that, "Kilpatrick used his special administrator authority to bypass the water board and City Council on three controversial contracts." These included a $131 million radio system for the city's police and fire departments, as well as a no-bid PR contract to a close personal aide. But Judge Feikens praised the mayor's work as steward of the department, referring questions on the contracts to the special master in charge of that investigation.

2005 re-election campaign

At a campaign rally in May 2005, Kilpatrick's father Bernard adamantly argued that allegations that the Mayor had held a party at the Manoogian Mansion were a lie, likening such statements to the false scapegoating of Jewish people by the Nazis. Bernard later apologized. In October 2005, a third-party group supporting Kilpatrick, named The Citizens for Honest Government, generated controversy by its print advertisement that compared media criticism of the mayor to lynch mobs.

Kilpatrick and his opponent Freman Hendrix, both Democrats, each initially claimed victory. However, as the votes were tallied, it became clear that Kilpatrick had come back from his stretch of unpopularity to win a second term in office. Three months previously, most commentators declared his political career over after he was the first incumbent mayor of Detroit to come in second in a primary. Pre-election opinion polls predicted a large win for Hendrix; however, Kilpatrick won with 53% of the vote.

Second term
In July 2006, Kilpatrick was hospitalized and diagnosed with diverticulitis while in Houston, Texas. His personal physician indicated that Kilpatrick's condition may have been caused by a high-protein weight-loss diet. That month, Detroit's City Council had voted unanimously to approve Kilpatrick's tax plan, with which he intended to offer homeowners some relief from the city's high property tax rates. The cuts ranged from 18% to 35%, depending on the property's value.

Audit reports
The city of Detroit was fourteen months late in filing its 2005–2006 audit. In March 2008, officials estimated the audit would cost an additional $2.4 million because of new auditing requirements that were not addressed by the city. The 2006–2007 fiscal year audit due on December 31, 2007, was expected to be eleven months late.

The state treasury chose to withhold $35 million of its monthly revenue sharing to the city and required Detroit to receive approval before selling bonds to raise money. Kilpatrick told the City Council that he would take partial blame for the late audits because he laid off too many accountants, but he also blamed the firm hired to replace them.

2008 State of the City address
In March 2008, Kilpatrick delivered his seventh "State of the City" address to the city of Detroit. The speech marked a turning point in his career. The majority of the 70-minute speech focused on positive changes occurring throughout Detroit and future plans. Kilpatrick specifically noted increased police surveillance, new policing technologies, and initiatives to rebuild blighted neighborhoods. He received repeated standing ovations from the invitation-only audience.

Toward the end of the speech, Kilpatrick deviated from the transcript given to the media and posted on his official website to address the scandals and controversies surrounding his years in office, stating that the media were focusing on only these incidents to increase their viewership. In closing, he addressed the City Council members who chose not to sit behind him on the stage in protest, particularly Kenneth Cockrel Jr., and, despite the fact that the city administration of Detroit was almost entirely African-American, assumed the criticism was based on race:

Kilpatrick's comments generated many negative responses. Michigan Governor and fellow Democrat Jennifer Granholm issued a statement in which she condemned the use of the N-word in any context. Michigan Attorney General Mike Cox stated on WJR talk radio that he thought that using the N-word was "reprehensible", saying, "I thought his statements were race-baiting on par with David Duke and George Wallace, all to save his political career. I'm not a Detroiter, but last night crossed the line ... those statements not only hurt Detroit, [but] as long as the mayor is there, he will be a drag on the whole region." Cox said that whether Kilpatrick is criminally charged or not, he should resign as mayor. Former Kilpatrick political adviser Sam Riddle labeled the address a race-baiting speech. "It's an act of desperation to use the N-word," said Riddle. "He's attempting to regain his base of support by playing the race card. He's gone to that well one too many times."

In response to Kilpatrick characterizing the media coverage of his scandals as a baseless "hate-driven bigoted assault on a family", Carmen Harlan, an African-American news anchor at Detroit's NBC affiliate, WDIV, stated the following:

In March 2008, the National Conference of Black Mayors moved its meeting from Detroit to New Orleans, Louisiana, because of Kilpatrick's legal problems.

Affiliations
Kilpatrick is a member of the Democratic Party.

He was a member of the Mayors Against Illegal Guns Coalition, a bi-partisan anti-gun group with a stated goal of "making the public safer by getting illegal guns off the streets." The Coalition was co-chaired by Mayor Thomas Menino of Boston and Michael Bloomberg of New York City. Following Kilpatrick's conviction in 2013 on federal charges, his membership status in the organization was initially not clear. As of September 2010, there had been no announcement of his resignation from Mayors Against Illegal Guns; however, by December 2012, he was no longer listed as a member.

Electoral history
2005 Race for Mayor (Detroit)
Kwame Kilpatrick (D) (incumbent), 53%
Freman Hendrix (D), 47%
2005 Race for Mayor (Detroit) (Primary Election)
Freman Hendrix (D), 45%
Kwame Kilpatrick (D) (incumbent), 34%
Sharon McPhail (D), 12%
Hansen Clarke (D), 8%
2001 Race for Mayor (Detroit)
Kwame Kilpatrick (D), 54%
Gil Hill (D), 46%

Controversies, felony trials, and incarceration

Alleged incidents of mayoral misconduct

Manoogian Mansion party

In the fall of 2002, it was alleged that Kilpatrick had held a wild party involving strippers at the Manoogian Mansion, the city-owned residence of the mayor of Detroit. Former members of the Executive Protection Unit (EPU), the mayor's police security detail, alleged that Carlita Kilpatrick, Kwame's wife, came home unexpectedly and physically attacked an exotic dancer. Officer Harold C. Nelthrope contacted the Internal Affairs unit of the Detroit Police Department in April 2003 to recommend that they investigate abuses by the EPU. Kilpatrick denied any wrongdoing. An investigation by Michigan Attorney General Cox and the Michigan State Police found no evidence that the party took place.

Nelthrope and Internal Affairs investigator Gary A. Brown allege that they were fired by the Kilpatrick administration in retaliation for investigating the mayor and other superiors. Nelthrope and Brown filed a whistleblower lawsuit and were awarded a $6.5 million settlement. Additionally, two other police officers, Walt Harris and Alvin Bowman, claimed they were retaliated against for their involvement in investigations into the mayor's misconduct. Harris was a former member of the EPU who was identified by the administration as cooperating with the state's investigation. He then suffered a smear campaign in the media by the administration.

Murder of Tamara Greene
Tamara Greene, a 27-year-old exotic dancer who went by the name "Strawberry", allegedly performed at the Manoogian Mansion party and was allegedly the person assaulted by Carlita Kilpatrick. Greene was murdered on April 30, 2003, at around 3:40 a.m., near the intersection of Roselawn and West Outer Drive while sitting in her car with her 32-year-old boyfriend. She was shot multiple times with a .40 caliber Glock pistol. At the time, this was the same model and caliber firearm as those officially issued by the Detroit Police Department. Investigators believed this to be a "deliberate hit" by a member of the Detroit Police.

Greene's family filed a federal lawsuit against the city of Detroit for $150 million, claiming she was murdered to prevent her testimony about the Manoogian Mansion party. A judge ruled that Norman Yatooma, the attorney representing Greene's 14-year-old son, could have access to text messages between Kilpatrick, police chief Ella Bully-Cummings and dozens of city employees to ascertain if city officials blocked the investigation into the murder. Yatooma also wanted the text messages and GPS positions of every city employee exchanged between 1:30 a.m. and 5:30 a.m. on the night of the murder. The city's communications provider, Skytel, indicated it was prepared to release the text messages if the court ruled accordingly.

On March 1, 2008, a ten-page affidavit by former Detroit Police lieutenant Alvin Bowman was filed by Yatooma in the U.S. District Court for the Eastern District of Michigan, stating that, "I suspected that the shooter was a law enforcement officer, and more specifically, a Detroit Police Department officer." Bowman also claims that high-ranking Detroit Police personnel, including Cummings, deliberately sabotaged his investigation, stating that he was eventually transferred out of the Homicide Division because he had asked too many questions about the Greene murder and the Manoogian Mansion party. Bowman also claims that Greene was employed by an unnamed associate of Kilpatrick and that her telephone records linked her to a high-ranking city employee not long before her death. Mayer Morganroth, the lawyer representing the city, said, "The Bowman affidavit is a little less than idiotic and more than absurd."

In another affidavit, Joyce Carolyn Rogers, a former Detroit Police employee, stated that she read a police report that came across her desk in the fall of 2002 regarding Carlita Kilpatrick's assault of Greene during the party. Rogers stated that Carlita had witnessed Greene touching the mayor "in a manner that upset the mayor's wife." Rogers alleged that Carlita struck Greene with a wooden object, and that two men stepped in to restrain her. Yatooma said that Rogers' affidavit showed that the party was not "urban legend."

Three Detroit paramedics – Lt. Michael Kearns, Lt. Walter Godzwon, and Cenobio Chapa – signed affidavits concerning Greene. Kearns claimed he spoke to Greene around the time of the party. Godzwon claimed he saw Kilpatrick and his bodyguards at Detroit Receiving Hospital, where an injured woman was taken. Chapa claimed that he saw an injured woman brought to the hospital by three plainclothes police officers in the autumn of 2002, and heard the woman say she had been attacked by Carlita. Chapa also said that he ran into medical technician Doug Bayer, and had told him about what he had seen; Bayer had previously told State Police of such an encounter.

Whistleblower trial
In 2003, a civil lawsuit was filed against Kilpatrick by ex-bodyguard Harold Nelthrope and former Deputy Police Chief Gary Brown. The officers claimed they were fired because of an internal probe into the mayor's personal actions and that the firing was a violation of the whistleblower law. The trial began in August 2007 with Kilpatrick and his chief of staff, Christine Beatty, both denying they were involved in an extramarital affair. In his testimony, Kilpatrick expressed anger about claims of an affair between him and Beatty and under oath said:

The trial ended on September 11, 2007, after three hours of jury deliberation, with a verdict awarding the plaintiffs $6.5 million in damages. In an angry speech in front of City Hall, minutes after the verdict was read, Kilpatrick blamed the "wrong verdict" on white suburbanite jurors. He also stated, "There's race in this, and we run from it in this region. And I think it's impossible for us to move forward as a region without confronting it head-on. But I don't want what has happened in the past 24 months to be erased by what has happened in the last two days."

Kilpatrick vowed to appeal the verdict. However, weeks later, during stalled settlement negotiations, he quickly approved an $8.4 million settlement upon learning of a motion by Mike Stefani, Nelthorpe and Brown's attorney, that contained evidence that Kilpatrick and Beatty had perjured themselves in their deposition and trial testimony. The City Council voted to pay the $8.4 million to Nelthorpe and Brown, and a third former officer who filed a separate lawsuit against Kilpatrick. The City Council was not made aware of the text messages or a confidentiality agreement to keep them private when Kilpatrick and city lawyers requested the council to approve the $8.4 million settlement.

The Detroit Free Press, The Detroit News, and the City Council sued under the Michigan Freedom of Information Act (FOIA) requesting that the city release all settlement-related documents. The FOIA lawsuit ordered Stefani to be deposed by the plaintiffs. He revealed in the deposition the existence of a confidentiality agreement signed by all parties to keep confidential intimate text messages sent between Kilpatrick and Beatty. The City of Detroit Law Department initially denied the existence of a "secret deal", but later fought unsuccessfully up to the Michigan Supreme Court to keep the documents sealed, on the grounds that they are private communications.

The unsealed documents revealed the stratagem of Kilpatrick and the City of Detroit Law Department to hide a series of text messages that contradicted the sworn testimony of Kilpatrick and Beatty. These documents provided the basis for a criminal investigation against the pair.

The secret deal called for Brown to forfeit $3 million, Nelthrope to forfeit $2 million and Harris to give up $400,000 if they ever revealed the information; Stefani would forfeit $2.6 million in legal fees if he or any of his employees ever divulged the existence of the text messages.

An investigation by Wayne County Prosecutor Kym Worthy concluded with Kilpatrick and Beatty being charged with obstruction of justice, conspiracy, misconduct in office, and perjury. The City Council requested that Kilpatrick resign as mayor and that Governor Granholm use her authority to remove him from office due to his conduct in the trial. Granholm said the inquiry was like a trial and that her role would be "functioning in a manner similar to that of a judicial officer." Kilpatrick said he had paid back the $8.4 million through "hard work for the city" and dismissed any intentions of removing himself from office as "political rhetoric."

Text-messaging scandal

In January 2008, the Detroit Free Press revealed the existence of more than 14,000 text messages exchanged between Kilpatrick and Beatty on their city-issued Skytel pagers in late 2002 and early 2003. The dates are of importance because they encompass the time periods of the alleged Manoogian Mansion party and the ouster of Brown, respectively. The bulk of the text messages were released in late October 2008 by Circuit Court Judge Timothy Kenny, who instructed that some portions be redacted.

The text messages were the nucleus of an $8.4 million secret deal settlement by the city of Detroit, which required the plaintiffs in the police whistleblower trial to keep the damaging text messages confidential. The attorneys for the city had tried since 2004 to keep the text messages hidden on the grounds that they were personal and private communications. But, a city directive re-authorized by Kilpatrick during his first term as mayor said that all electronic communication sent on city equipment should be "used in an honest, ethical, and legal manner" and cautions, "is not considered to be personal or private." The mayor's spokesman said the policy applies only to city-owned equipment, and the text messages are exempt since they were sent on a city-leased device.

Kilpatrick and Beatty, both in separate marriages at the time, did discuss city business at times in their texts; however, many of the series of messages describe their extramarital sexual relationship, often in graphic detail. The text messages further describe their use of city funds to arrange romantic getaways, their fears of being caught by the EPU, and evidence that the pair conspired to fire Brown.

On January 28, 2008, Beatty resigned from her position as Kilpatrick's chief of staff. On March 18, 2008, the City Council passed a non-binding resolution asking for Kilpatrick to resign as mayor. The vote was 7–1, with Monica Conyers as the only member to vote no. Martha Reeves was absent from the vote. The resolution cited 33 reasons for Kilpatrick to step down, ranging from the secret settlement deals to mandatory audits not being submitted to the state, to charges that Kilpatrick "repeatedly obfuscates the truth." Kilpatrick dismissed the vote as irrelevant and declared that he would not resign as mayor. The council responded by asking its independent attorney, Bill Goodman, to "explore the proceedings by which the mayor may be removed from office."

On March 26, 2008, the Free Press published another text message contradicting Kilpatrick's testimony that Brown's employment was not terminated. Six weeks after Brown's employment with the Detroit Police ended and hours before Attorney General Cox was to announce the findings of his office's investigation into the mayor's scandals, Kilpatrick texted his staff on June 24, 2003:

On the stand in the whistleblower trial, Kilpatrick stated that Brown was "unappointed" from his duties as Deputy Police Chief and head of the department's Internal Affairs unit. The jury found in favor of Brown's account that he was fired and not "unappointed."

Criminal charges

On March 24, 2008, Worthy announced a twelve-count criminal indictment against Kilpatrick and Beatty, charging Kilpatrick with eight felonies and Beatty with seven. Charges for both included perjury, misconduct in office, and obstruction of justice. Worthy suggested that others in the Kilpatrick administration could also be charged.
The preliminary examination scheduled for September 22, 2008, was waived by both defendants, thereby allowing the case to proceed directly to trial.

In March 2008, a group of Kilpatrick's supporters created the "Detroit Justice Fund" to help cover the cost of the mayor's legal defense. Members of the fund's supervisory committee include former San Francisco mayor Willie Brown and former DTE executive Martin Taylor. Greg Mathis, a retired District Court judge and adjudicator for his self-titled television court show, was listed as a committee member, but disavowed any such support. He subsequently called for Kilpatrick to resign.

In early August 2008, Detroit's WXYZ-TV reported that on July 23 of that year, Kilpatrick had violated the provisions of his bail when he briefly traveled to the neighboring Canadian city of Windsor, Ontario, where he met with Windsor mayor Eddie Francis concerning a deal to have the city of Windsor take over operational control of the Detroit-Windsor Tunnel in exchange for a $75 million loan to the cash-strapped city of Detroit. While Kilpatrick claimed that Francis had requested the meeting without prior notice, several Windsor city officials, including Francis, claimed that Kilpatrick in fact requested the meeting. Kilpatrick traveled without informing the court, as required by terms of his bail agreement. As a result, on August 7, 2008, Kilpatrick was remanded to spend a night in the Wayne County Jail. It was the first time in history that a sitting Detroit mayor had been ordered to jail. In issuing the order, Chief Judge Ronald Giles stated that he could not treat the mayor differently from "John Six-Pack." On August 8, 2008, after arguments on Kilpatrick's behalf by attorneys Jim Parkman and Jim Thomas, Judge Thomas Jackson reversed the remand order and permitted Kilpatrick to be released on posting a $50,000 cash bond and the further condition that the mayor not travel, and wear an electronic tracking device.

The same day Kilpatrick was released under the second bail agreement, Michigan Attorney General Mike Cox announced that two new felony counts had been filed against the mayor for assaulting or interfering with a law officer. The new charges arose out of allegations that Kilpatrick on July 24, 2008, shoved two Wayne County Sheriff's Deputies who were attempting to serve a subpoena on Bobby Ferguson, a Kilpatrick ally, and a potential witness in the mayor's then-upcoming perjury trial.

On September 4, 2008, Kwame Kilpatrick pleaded guilty to two felony counts of obstruction of justice and pleaded no contest to assaulting the deputy. As part of the plea agreement, he agreed to serve four months in the Wayne County Jail, pay one million dollars of restitution to the city of Detroit, surrender his license to practice law, five years probation and not run for public office during his probation period. He also was required to resign as mayor of Detroit and surrender his state pension from his six years' service in the Michigan House of Representatives before being elected mayor. In an allocution given as part of his plea, Kilpatrick admitted that he lied under oath several times. His last day in office was September 18, 2008.

Slander suit
Kilpatrick was named in a slander lawsuit along with Christine Beatty and then-police chief Ella Bully-Cummings. The lawsuit was brought about by two police officers who claimed to have been slandered in the media by city officials.

The lawsuit stemmed from a 2004 incident in which the two police officers pulled Beatty over for speeding. The officers claimed that Beatty was irate at being stopped and bluntly asked the officers, "Do you know who the fuck I am?" when the officers came to the vehicle. The officers alleged that, while stopped, Beatty called Bully-Cummings to have the officers called off, which they were ordered to do. When reports of the incident started to surface in the media, Bully-Cummings said the officers harassed Beatty, and Kilpatrick said the stop "looked like a setup".

The parties in the lawsuit entered into mediation that recommended a settlement of $25,000 and that was rejected twice by the Detroit City Council.

In January 2008, it was revealed through text messages that Kilpatrick and Beatty were involved in a sexual relationship that both denied under oath. The attorney for the officers said, "I might take a different position on the case now. The mayor has been exposed and I may want more money for my clients now."

On February 19, 2008, the Detroit City Council voted unanimously to settle the lawsuit for $25,000. The attorney for the officers accepted the settlement and said of the officers, "They don't want to be embroiled in this whole scandal."

Synagro sludge contract
According to The Detroit News (June 24, 2010), Kwame Kilpatrick, his father Bernard, and the Kilpatrick Civic Fund may have been important figures in the sludge hauling contract that saw city council president Monica Conyers (wife of Rep. John Conyers) and her chief of staff Sam Riddle convicted for conspiracy and bribery. "Kilpatrick and his father also figured, but have not been charged, in evidence surrounding a bribery-tainted, $1.2 billion sewage sludge contract the Detroit City Council awarded to Synagro Technologies Inc. in 2007. According to court documents and people familiar with the case, former Synagro official James Rosendall made large contributions to the Kilpatrick Civic Fund and gave Kilpatrick free flights to Las Vegas and Mackinac Island. Rosendall also told investigators he made cash payments to Bernard N. Kilpatrick, who told Rosendall he got him access to City Hall, records show." Rosendall and a Synagro consultant Rayford Jackson were also convicted of bribery.

Recall campaign
The Wayne County Election Committee approved a recall petition to remove Kilpatrick as mayor based on the multimillion-dollar settlement ($9,000,000+) in a whistle-blower lawsuit against the city, and the accusation that Kilpatrick misled the City Council into approving the settlement. The recall petition was filed by Douglas Johnson, a city council candidate. Kilpatrick appealed to the commission to reconsider its decision on the grounds that Johnson was not a resident of Detroit. Johnson also requested that Jennifer Granholm use her power as Governor to remove Kilpatrick from office.

On March 12, 2008, at the request of the Mayor's office, Wayne County Election Commission rescinded its earlier approval for the recall. The Mayor's office argued that there was not any evidence that the organizer, Douglas Johnson, actually resided within the city limits of Detroit. Johnson stated that his group would refile using another person whose residency would not be an issue. On March 27, 2008, a second recall petition was filed against Kilpatrick by Angelo Brown. Brown stated in his filing that Kilpatrick is too preoccupied with his legal problems to be effective. Kilpatrick's spokesman James Canning again dismissed this latest recall by saying: "It's Mr. Brown's right to file a petition, but it's just another effort by a political hopeful to grab headlines."

On May 14 the Detroit City Council voted to request that the governor of Michigan, Jennifer Granholm, remove Kilpatrick from office.

Funneling of state grant money to wife
Kilpatrick used his influence while in the Michigan legislature to funnel state grant money to two organizations that were vague on their project description. The groups were run by friends of Kilpatrick and both agreed to subcontract work to U.N.I.T.E., a company owned by Kilpatrick's wife Carlita. Carlita was the only employee and the firm received $175,000 from the organizations. Detroit 3D was one of the groups and the State canceled its second and final installment of $250,000 because 3D refused to divulge details on how the funds were being spent.

Denial of courtesy protection
In 2002, the Washington D.C. police announced that they would only offer professional courtesy protection to Kilpatrick while he was conducting official business in the nation's capital. D.C. police no longer provided after-hours police protection to Kilpatrick because of his inappropriate partying during past visits. Sergeant Tyrone Dodson of Washington D.C. explained by saying "we arrived at this decision because we felt that the late evening partying on the part of Mayor Kilpatrick would leave our officers stretched too thin and might result in an incident at one of the clubs."  The Kilpatrick administration alleged that the statements and actions of the Washington D.C. police were part of a political conspiracy to "ruin" the mayor. Kilpatrick's father-in-law Carlton Poles was a veteran D.C. Police officer.

Nepotism and preferential hiring of friends and family
It was revealed that at any given time there are about 100 appointees of Kilpatrick employed with the city. The Detroit Free Press examined city records and found that 29 of Kilpatrick's closest friends and family were appointed to positions within the various city departments. This hiring practice came to be known as 'the friends and family plan'. Some appointees had little to no experience, while others, among them Kilpatrick's uncle Ray Cheeks and cousin Nneka Cheeks, falsified their résumés. Kilpatrick's cousin Patricia Peoples was appointed to the deputy director of human resources, giving her the ability to hire more of Kilpatrick's friends and family without such hirings being viewed as mayoral appointments. Although political appointments are not illegal, the sheer volume of Kilpatrick's appointments compared to all the appointments made by Detroit mayors since 1970, along with Kilpatrick's cutting of thousands of city jobs, made his appointments controversial.

The jobs held by friends and family ranged from secretarial positions to department heads. The appointees had an average salary increase of 36% compared with a 2% raise in 2003 and 2% raise in 2004 for fellow city workers. Some of the biggest salary increases were for April Edgar, half-sister of Christine Beatty, whose pay increase was 86% over 5 years. One of Kilpatrick's cousins, Ajene Evans, had a 77% increase in his salary during this 5-year period. The biggest salary increase among the 29 appointees was that of LaTonya Wallace-Hardiman who went from $32,500 staff secretary, to an executive assistant making $85,501—163% in five years.

Abuse of power allegations
It was revealed on July 15, 2008, by WXYZ reporter Steve Wilson that in 2005 Kwame Kilpatrick, Christine Beatty, and the chief of police Ella Bully-Cummings allegedly used their positions to help an influential Baptist minister arrested for soliciting a prostitute get his case dismissed. The arresting officer, Antoinette Bostic, was told by her supervisors that Mangedwa Nyathi was a minister (Assistant Pastor at Hartford Memorial Baptist Church on Detroit's west side), and that the mayor and police chief were calling to persuade Bostic not to show up to court, in which case the judge would be forced to dismiss the case against Nyathi. Bostic ignored her supervisors and appeared in court. The defense lawyer, Charles Hammons, had the case postponed a couple of times and stated in court that "The mayor told me yesterday that this case is not gonna go forward." Hammons admitted to Wilson that this was the fact and that this was how many cases for people who know the mayor in Detroit are handled. Bully-Cummings angrily denied that she had ever asked her officers to perform such acts of impropriety. Kilpatrick stated that Wilson of WXYZ "was just making up stories again."

Assaulting a police officer
On July 24, 2008, at approximately 4 p.m., Wayne County Sheriff's Detective Brian White and Joanne Kinney, an investigator from Wayne County Prosecutor Kym Worthy's office, went to Kilpatrick's sister Ayanna Kilpatrick's home in an attempt to serve a subpoena. Ayanna Kilpatrick is married to Daniel Ferguson, cousin of Bobby Ferguson, later indicted along with Kwame Kilpatrick. While on the front porch of the home, Kwame Kilpatrick came out of the house with his bodyguards and pushed the sheriff's deputy, as Sheriff Warren Evans said "... pushed him with significant force to make him bounce into the prosecutor's investigator". The mayor yelled at Kinney "How can a black woman be riding in a car with a man named White?" Evans went on to say "There were armed executive protection officers. My officers were there armed. And all of them had the consummate good sense not to let it escalate"... and "the two officers 'wisely' left the property and returned to their office to report on the incident."

Sheriff Evans stated that due to the "politically charged nature" of the incident, the case has been transferred to the Michigan State Police to investigate. Evans' daughter, who was on Kwame Kilpatrick's staff, resigned shortly after this incident.

2010 indictment for tax evasion and mail fraud
On May 8, 2007, WXYZ-TV reported that Kilpatrick used $8,600 from the Kilpatrick Civic Fund to take his wife, three sons and babysitter on a week-long vacation to a five-star California resort, the La Costa Resort and Spa. The fund, controlled by Kilpatrick's sister and friends, was created to improve the city of Detroit through voter education, economic empowerment, and crime prevention. Tax and accounting experts said Kilpatrick's use of the fund was a violation of IRS regulations. The story was also compounded after WXYZ's cameras caught Kilpatrick in a fit of rage grabbing the microphone out of the hand of reporter Ray Sayah and throwing it.

On June 23, 2010, Kilpatrick was indicted on 19 federal counts including 10 counts of mail fraud, three counts of wire fraud, five counts of filing a false tax return, and one count of tax evasion. Each count of fraud carries a maximum sentence of 20 year imprisonment and a fine of $250,000. Each tax count carries a maximum sentence of three or five years and a fine of $250,000.

It is alleged that Kilpatrick devised a scheme to use the Kilpatrick Civic Fund to pay for personal expenses and to fund his mayoral campaigns. Some of the alleged expenses include yoga, golf clubs, summer camp for his children, personal travel, a lease on a Cadillac DeVille, moving expenses, a crisis manager for overseeing his public image, and focus groups.

FBI corruption investigation of Kilpatrick family and friends
The Federal Bureau of Investigation investigated corruption within Detroit's city hall; in particular, how contracts are awarded. Through the use of undercover video, wiretaps, and informants, the FBI investigated whether Bernard Kilpatrick, father of Kwame Kilpatrick and ex-husband of U.S. Representative Carolyn Cheeks-Kilpatrick, was involved in payoff schemes to steer city business to contractors and then illegally funnel any money or kickbacks back to his son, the mayor, Kwame. The FBI also announced that Derrick Miller, a close friend of Kilpatrick's who was a top adviser in the Kilpatrick campaigns and most recently (2007) was the chief information officer of the City of Detroit, was named as a target of the corruption investigation. Kandia Milton, deputy mayor, who ran the city for one day when Kilpatrick was in jail for violating his bail, pleaded guilty to federal bribery charges involving the sale of city-owned land.

SEC investigation into pension funds influence peddling 
In 2012, the Securities and Exchange Commission charged Kilpatrick and former city treasurer Jeffrey W. Beasley for receiving $180,000 in travel, hotel rooms, and gifts from a company seeking investments from the city pension fund. Chauncey C. Mayfield and his company were also brought before administrative proceedings. The company received a $117 million investment in a real estate investment trust that it controlled. MayfieldGentry proceeded to misappropriate $3.1 million from the pension fund which was revealed during the influence peddling investigation. Mayfield pleaded guilty in 2013. The case was scheduled for June 2014.

Resignation and incarceration
On March 24, 2008, Kilpatrick was charged with eight felony counts, including perjury, misconduct in office, and obstruction of justice. On May 13, 2008, the Detroit City Council approved a resolution to request that Michigan's governor, Jennifer Granholm, remove Kilpatrick from office. On August 8, 2008, Michigan's Attorney General, Mike Cox, announced two new felony counts had been filed against Kilpatrick for assaulting and interfering with a law officer.

On September 4, 2008, Kilpatrick announced his resignation as mayor, effective September 18, following a guilty plea to two felonies for obstruction of justice arising from a complex settlement scheme in a civil case where he lied about an extra-marital affair under oath, then caused the case to be settled at a premium in exchange for an agreement by the parties not to disclose his affair. He then misrepresented the settlement to the citizens of Detroit and City Council. As a result of his guilty plea, Kilpatrick will pay restitution to the city of Detroit in the amount of one million dollars, lose his pension, serve four months in the Wayne County jail, serve five years probation, and surrender his law license; he is also prohibited from running for public office for five years.

In the separate assault case, he pleaded no contest to one felony count of assaulting and obstructing a police officer in exchange for a second assault charge being dropped. This deal also required his resignation and 120 days in jail, to be served concurrently with his jail time for the perjury counts. Kilpatrick was sentenced on October 28, 2008. The judge ordered that Kilpatrick not be given an opportunity for early release, but instead serve the entire 120 days in jail.

In court hearings held in November and December 2009, it was revealed that several prominent Detroit businessmen provided undocumented loans to Kilpatrick and his wife in a quid-pro-quo for his resignation. The total amount of the loans was $240,000.

Detroit City Council President Kenneth Cockrel, Jr. replaced Kilpatrick as mayor at 12:01 a.m. September 19, 2008.

First sentencing and incarceration
Judge David Groner sentenced former Detroit Mayor Kwame Kilpatrick to four months in jail on Tuesday, October 28, 2008, for the sex-and-text scandal, calling him "arrogant and defiant" and questioning the sincerity of a guilty plea that ended his career at City Hall.
The punishment was part of a plea agreement worked out a month earlier. "When someone gets 120 days in jail, they should get 120 days in jail," Groner said. Kilpatrick also was given a 120-day concurrent sentence for assaulting a sheriff's officer who was trying to deliver a subpoena in July. He was seen smirking, laughing, and even calling the sentencing a "joke". Wayne County Sheriff Warren Evans said that they take 40,000 prisoners into the prison annually, but that Kilpatrick would be kept separate from the general population and "won't be treated any worse or any better than other prisoners."
He was housed in a secured, 15 feet by 10 feet cell with a bed, chair, toilet and a shower, spending approximately 23 hours a day there. At 12:35 a.m. on Tuesday, February 3, 2009, Kilpatrick left jail after serving 99 days. He boarded a privately chartered Lear jet and landed in Texas that evening. He was supposed to join his family in a $3,000 per month rental house in Southlake, Texas.

Within a couple of weeks, Kilpatrick was hired by Covisint, a Texas subsidiary of Compuware, headquartered in Detroit. CEO of Compuware Peter Karmanos, Jr. was one of the parties who loaned large sums of money to Kilpatrick in late 2008. Kilpatrick was let go from Compuware in May 2010 after being sentenced to prison.

Restitution hearing
Kilpatrick claimed poverty to Judge David Groner. He said he only had $3,000 per month (later lowered to $6) for the restitution payments.

Judge Groner requested detailed financial records for Kwame, his wife, their children, etc. By November 2009, Kilpatrick was on the stand in Detroit to explain his apparent poverty. He claimed to have no knowledge about who paid for his million-dollar home, Cadillac Escalades, and other lavish expenses. The former mayor also denied any knowledge of his wife's finances, or even whether she was employed. During this hearing, it was revealed that Peter Karmanos Jr., Roger Penske and other business leaders had provided substantial monies to the Kilpatricks to convince the mayor to resign his office and plead guilty. On January 20, 2010, Judge Groner ruled that Kilpatrick pay the sum of $300,000 to the city of Detroit within 90 days.

Second sentencing and incarceration
On February 19, 2010, Kilpatrick missed a required restitution payment of $79,000. The court received only $14,000 on February 19 and then only another $21,175 on February 22. On February 23, Judge Groner approved a warrant for Kilpatrick and ruled in April that he had violated the terms of his probation. On May 25, 2010, Kilpatrick was sentenced to one and a half to five years with the Michigan Department of Corrections (with credit for 120 days previously served) for violation of probation, and was afterwards taken back into correctional custody. He was housed for fourteen days in the hospital unit of the state prisoner reception center. Kilpatrick was later housed in the Oaks Correctional Facility. After he was indicted in federal court for additional crimes related to alleged misuse of his campaign funds, Kilpatrick lobbied for a transfer from the Oaks Correctional Facility. On July 11, 2010, he was transferred into the Federal Bureau of Prisons (BOP). Kilpatrick was incarcerated in the Milan Federal Prison near Milan, Michigan. He was released from federal custody on April 6, 2011. During his final 118 days of state imprisonment, Kilpatrick resided in the Cotton Correctional Facility. Kilpatrick was released on parole on August 2, 2011. In August 2011 the court ordered Kilpatrick to pay for his incarceration costs.

Memoir
Kilpatrick co-wrote a memoir about his life and political experiences titled Surrendered: The Rise, Fall, & Revelation of Kwame Kilpatrick. The book was originally scheduled for release on August 2, 2011, a date that would have just barely preceded his scheduled release from a Michigan prison. However, the publisher delayed the release to August 9, almost a week after Kilpatrick was paroled. Kilpatrick appeared at public events in Michigan and elsewhere to promote his book.

The public prosecutor in Wayne County, Michigan has asked the state courts to order the book's publisher, Tennessee-based Creative Publishing Consultants Inc., to remit Kilpatrick's share on the book's proceeds for payment toward Kilpatrick's criminal restitution and his cost of incarceration. On November 16, 2011, the publisher's attorney failed to appear at a hearing on the matter in Wayne County Circuit Court. A bench warrant was issued for the attorney, Jack Gritton, and was forwarded to authorities in Tennessee, where Gritton's practice is based.

2012–2013 felony corruption trial and conviction
On December 14, 2010, Kilpatrick was again indicted on new corruption charges, in what a federal prosecutor called a "pattern of extortion, bribery and fraud" by some of the city's most prominent officials. His father, Bernard Kilpatrick, was also indicted, as was contractor Bobby Ferguson; Kilpatrick's aide, Derrick Miller; and Detroit water department chief Victor Mercado. The original 38-charge indictment listed allegations of 13 fraudulent schemes in awarding contracts in the city's Department of Water and Sewerage, with pocketed kickbacks of nearly $1,000,000. He was arraigned on January 10, 2011, on charges in the 89-page indictment. Federal prosecuting attorneys proposed a trial date in January 2012, but defense attorneys asked for a trial date in the summer of 2012. Opening statements in the trial began on September 21, 2012. Prosecutors soon brought forth a large number of witnesses who gave damaging testimony. Mercado took a plea deal while the trial was in progress. On March 11, 2013, in spite of a vigorous defense that cost taxpayers more than a million dollars, Kilpatrick was found guilty by a jury on two dozen counts including those for racketeering, extortion, mail fraud, and tax evasion, among others. Shortly after conviction, speaking about Kilpatrick, Judge Nancy Edmunds ruled in favor of remand saying "detention is required in his circumstance". He was sentenced to 28 years in prison on October 10, 2013. Kilpatrick, Federal Bureau of Prisons Register #44678-039, was serving his sentence at Federal Correctional Institution, Oakdale, a low-security prison in Oakdale, Louisiana. There is no parole in the federal prison system. However, with time off for good behavior, his earliest possible release date was August 1, 2037—when he would be 67 years old.

Mercado pleaded guilty to one count of conspiracy, Bobby Ferguson was sentenced to 21 years in prison, Derrick Miller pleaded guilty to tax evasion and was sentenced to three years supervision, the first year in a halfway house. Bernard Kilpatrick was sentenced to 15 months in prison. Emma Bell received two years probation and was fined $330,000 in back taxes as part of a plea deal where she testified that she frequently handed Kilpatrick large amounts of cash skimmed from campaign accounts. First Independence Bank, used by Kilpatrick and Ferguson, was fined $250,000 for failing to follow anti-money-laundering regulations. 14 companies were suspended from bidding on contracts with the water department in the wake of the scandal. Inland Waters Pollution Control Inc. paid $4.5 million in the settlement of a lawsuit over their involvement with Kilpatrick, Ferguson and the Detroit Water Board. Lakeshore TolTest Corp. reached a $5 million settlement with the Water Board to avoid litigation.

In August 2015, the United States Court of Appeals for the Sixth Circuit upheld his convictions but ordered that the amount of restitution be recalculated. In June 2016, the U.S. Supreme Court denied his appeal.

In June 2018 Kilpatrick began seeking a pardon from President Donald Trump. His application has been opposed by the U.S. Attorney's Office for southeast Michigan. Restitution claims and other civil lawsuits accumulated claimed $10 million in debts, for which Kilpatrick is responsible. Kilpatrick has no assets to settle these claims.

Commutation of sentence
On January 20, 2021, President Donald Trump commuted Kilpatrick's sentence with less than 12 hours remaining before he was due to leave office. The White House statement on the pardoning of Kilpatrick reads: "Mr. Kilpatrick has served approximately 7 years in prison for his role in a racketeering and bribery scheme while he held public office. During his incarceration, Mr. Kilpatrick has taught public speaking classes and has led Bible Study groups with his fellow inmates." President Trump's commutation allowed Kilpatrick to gain release 20 years early, though it did not vacate his conviction. The commutation left in place the almost $4.8 million in restitution and the three-year probation. Kilpatrick will not be able to run for office in Michigan until 2033 as a felon is excluded from politics for 20 years after conviction under Michigan law.

See also

Barbara L. McQuade, U.S. attorney who obtained a large number of indictments against Kilpatrick.
Louis Miriani, former mayor of Detroit
Richard Reading, former mayor of Detroit
List of American state and local politicians convicted of crimes

References

External links

|-

|-

1970 births
20th-century American politicians
21st-century American politicians
African-American mayors in Michigan
African-American state legislators in Michigan
American Pentecostals
American athlete-politicians
American memoirists
American politicians convicted of corruption
American prisoners and detainees
Cass Technical High School alumni
Detroit College of Law alumni
Disbarred American lawyers
Florida A&M Rattlers football players
Living people
Mayors of Detroit
Democratic Party members of the Michigan House of Representatives
Michigan State University College of Law alumni
Michigan politicians convicted of crimes
Players of American football from Detroit
Politicians convicted of mail and wire fraud
Politicians convicted of racketeering
Prisoners and detainees of Michigan
Prisoners and detainees of the United States federal government
Writers from Detroit
Recipients of American presidential clemency
20th-century African-American politicians
21st-century African-American politicians